Bottyán (or Battyán) may refer to:

Places
 Őrbottyán, a town in Hungary
 Ivánbattyán, a village in Hungary
 Szabadbattyán, a village in Hungary
 Battyán, the Hungarian name of Boťany, Slovakia
 Bottyánfalva, the Hungarian name of Bârna, Botinești, Romania
 Batthyány tér, an urban square in Budapest, Hungary
 Batthyány tér (Budapest Metro), a metro station in Budapest, Hungary

Other uses
 Batthyány, a Hungarian noble family, including a list of people with the name
 János Bottyán (1643–1709), Hungarian general

See also
 
 Battyánd, the Hungarian name of Puconci, Prekmurje, Slovenia
 Battyna, an ancient town in Orestis, Upper Macedonia

Hungarian-language surnames